Hurler of the Year can refer to the following.

 Texaco Hurler of the Year
 All Stars Hurler of the Year
 GPA Hurler of the Year